The 1971–72 AHL season was the 36th season of the American Hockey League. Major changes occurred in the off-season. The league welcomed four expansion teams, and lost both Quebec-based teams. Eleven teams played 76 games each in the schedule. The Boston Braves finished first overall in the regular season. The Nova Scotia Voyageurs won their first Calder Cup championship.

Team changes
 The Quebec Aces move to Richmond, Virginia becoming the Richmond Robins, playing in the West Division.
 The Montreal Voyageurs move to Halifax, Nova Scotia becoming the Nova Scotia Voyageurs.
 The Rochester Americans switch divisions from West to East.
 The Boston Braves join the AHL as an expansion team, based in Boston, Massachusetts, playing in the East Division.
 The Cincinnati Swords join the AHL as an expansion team, based in Cincinnati, Ohio, playing in the West Division.
 The Tidewater Wings join the AHL as an expansion team, based in Norfolk, Virginia, playing in the West Division.

Final standings
Note: GP = Games played; W = Wins; L = Losses; T = Ties; GF = Goals for; GA = Goals against; PTS = Points;

† First place tiebreaker determined by head-to-head competition during regular season.

Scoring leaders

Note: GP = Games played; G = Goals; A = Assists; Pts = Points; PIM = Penalty minutes

 complete list

Calder Cup playoffs

Trophy and award winners
Team awards

Individual awards

Other awards

See also
List of AHL seasons

References
AHL official site
AHL Hall of Fame
HockeyDB

 
American Hockey League seasons
2
2